Dimitar Petrov Dimitrov (born 9 June 1959), nicknamed Héro, is a Bulgarian professional football manager, who currently leads Spartak Varna.

Dimitrov represented hometown club Chernomorets Burgas as well Akademik Sofia before a serious injury forced his early retirement.

He has managed Neftochimic Burgas, Litex Lovech, the Bulgarian national team, Levski Sofia, Lokomotiv Plovdiv, Chernomorets Burgas, Amkar Perm, Al-Qadisiya, and Irtysh Pavlodar.  Dimitrov is known for his fiery temper and animated manner of coaching. His son, Viktor Dimitrov, has worked as assistant manager.

Honours

Coach 
Neftochimic Burgas
 Bulgarian A Football Group: Runner-up 1995–96
 Cup of PFL Winner: 1996, 1997

Litex Lovech
 Bulgarian A Football Group: 1997–98

Levski Sofia
 Bulgarian A Football Group: 1999–2000
 Bulgarian Cup: 2000

Ludogorets
 First League: 2017–18

Career statistics

References

External links
Dimitar Dimitrov at Footballdatabase

1959 births
Living people
Bulgarian footballers
FC Chernomorets Burgas players
Akademik Sofia players
First Professional Football League (Bulgaria) players
Association football defenders
Bulgarian football managers
PFC Litex Lovech managers
PFC Levski Sofia managers
FC Amkar Perm managers
Russian Premier League managers
Bulgaria national football team managers
Al Nassr FC managers
PSFC Chernomorets Burgas managers
Bulgarian expatriate football managers
Bulgarian expatriates in Saudi Arabia
Expatriate football managers in Russia
Expatriate football managers in Saudi Arabia
Expatriate football managers in Kazakhstan
Sportspeople from Burgas